Giordano Benedetti (born 22 May 1989 in Trento) is an Italian middle distance runner (800 m).

In his career, he has won the national championships seven times. He has 7 caps for the senior national team since 2009 Mediterranean Games. His personal best is 1:44.67 (6th best Italian crono of all-time), set on 6 June 2013 in Rome at Golden Gala.

International competitions

National titles
He has won 10 times the individual national championship.
5 wins in 800 metres at the Italian Athletics Championships (2011, 2012, 2014, 2015, 2016)
5 wins in 800 metres at the Italian Athletics Indoor Championships (2010, 2011, 2012, 2013, 2014)

See also
 Italian all-time lists - 800 metres

References

External links
 
 
 Giordano Benedetti at FIDAL 
 
 

1989 births
Living people
Sportspeople from Trento
Italian male middle-distance runners
World Athletics Championships athletes for Italy
Athletes (track and field) at the 2016 Summer Olympics
Olympic athletes of Italy
Athletics competitors of Fiamme Gialle
Athletes (track and field) at the 2009 Mediterranean Games
Mediterranean Games competitors for Italy